Melt Zonk Rewire is the second album by the New Klezmer Trio, Ben Goldberg - clarinet, Dan Seamans - bass, and Kenny Wollesen - drums, which was released on the Tzadik label in 1995.

Reception

In her review for Allmusic, Joslyn Layne observed "With a perfect mixture of a sincere love of music, wit, and serious chops, they create a new klezmer that draws from jazz, rock, and improvised traditions. Melt Zonk Rewire is full of creativity, with high energy and grooves tastefully offset by subdued, whispery pieces... essential for anyone whose music collection holds many disparate musical styles".

Track listing
All compositions by Ben Goldberg except as indicated
 "Gas Nine" (Traditional) - 2:24   
 "Sarcophagous" - 5:02   
 "The Haunt" (Dan Seamans) - 4:33   
 "Thermoglypics" - 3:33   
 "The Chant" - 3:23   
 "We Got There" (Seamans) - 5:27   
 "Feedback Doina" (Kenny Wollesen) - 5:08   
 "Freilakh Nakht" (Traditional) - 3:04   
 "Hypothetical" - 3:22   
 "The Shot" - 3:59   
 "Distiller" (Traditional) - 2:35   
 "Phrases" - 3:29   
 "Fourth Floor" (Seamans) - 2:59   
 "Starting Place" - 4:44

Personnel
Ben Goldberg - clarinet
Dan Seamans - bass
Kenny Wollesen - drums

References 

Tzadik Records albums
Ben Goldberg albums
1995 albums